Serie D, the fifth level of Italian Football, is usually composed of 162 teams divided into nine 18-team divisions.  Special relegation of four teams from the professional leagues above Serie D after the team list had been set increased the total number of teams for this season to 166.  One division will have 20 teams, two will have 19, while the other six will remain at 18 teams.

The regular Serie D season started September 7, 2008.  Each team will play two matches against every other team in its own division; a total of 34 matches for 18-team divisions, 36 matches for the 19-team divisions, and 38 matches for the 20-team division.    The nine division winners are automatically promoted to Lega Pro Seconda Divisione for the 2009-10 season, while the two last-placed teams are automatically relegated to Eccellenza.

After the regular season is complete, teams placed 6th-last through to 3rd-last in each division play a double-leg series (6th-last vs 3rd-last, 5th-last vs 4th-last) where the winners remain in Serie D the following season and the two losers are also relegated to Eccellenza for a total of 4 relegations in each division, 36 in total for the league.

The nine division winners enter a tournament to determine the over-all Serie D champion and is awarded the Scudetto Dilettanti.

Teams placed second through fifth in each division enter a playoff tournament after the regular season as well.  Eventually, a final game determines which team finishes first and which teams comes in second in this 36-team playoff, and these teams may be bumped up to Lega Pro Seconda Divisione if one or more current Seconda Divisione teams runs into financial difficulties or is penalized.

Events

Start of season
Given a normal season where there are no team failures and special promotions, Serie D would feature 9 teams that had been relegated from Lega Pro Seconda Divisione, 36 teams that had been promoted from Eccellenza, and 117 teams had played in Serie D the year before.  Due to nine bankruptcies and non-admissions in the professional leagues above Serie D, the 2008-09 season was to feature only 5 teams that played in 2007–08 Serie C2, 36 teams that played in 2007–08 Eccellenza, and 121 teams that played in 2007–08 Serie D.

After the 162-team list was set, the league admitted four of the teams that had failed in the senior leagues.
Messina & Spezia, both of whom played in 2007–08 Serie B, were placed in Girone I & Girone A respectively.  Sporting Lucchese & Massese, both of whom played in 2007–08 Serie C1, were both placed in Girone E.  The schedule in those 3 divisions needed to be expanded to accommodate these extra teams.

Promotions
On March 29, 2009 Siracusa became the first team to get promoted from Serie D in the season, winning the Girone I in advance of six weeks after a 2–0 home win to Rosarno that mathematically guaranteed a spot in the 2009–10 Lega Pro Seconda Divisione for the Sicilian side. They were followed one week later by Tuscans Sporting Lucchese, heir of AS Lucchese-Libertas, club formerly of Serie A and Serie B who was excluded from professional football only twelve months earlier. On April 26, Brindisi also obtained promotion to the fourth tier, after winning the Girone H in advance of three weeks.

On May 10, with only one weeks remaining in the league, four more teams mathematically won promotion to Lega Pro Seconda Divisione: Biellese (Girone A), Pro Belvedere Vercelli (Girone B), Sacilese (Girone C) and Villacidrese (Girone G). Seven days later the league winners list finally became complete, with Girone D winners Crociati Noceto (in a historical first promotion into professional football for the Emilian club) and Girone F champions Pro Vasto.

Standings
updated to games played May 17, 2009

Girone A
teams from Piedmont, Liguria & Aosta Valley

Girone B
teams from Lombardy & Piedmont

Girone C
teams from Veneto, Friuli-Venezia Giulia &Trentino-Alto Adige/Südtirol

Girone D
teams from Lombardy, Emilia-Romagna,Veneto & Tuscany

Girone E
teams from Tuscany, Umbria & Lazio

Girone F
teams from Marche, Abruzzo &Molise

Girone G
teams from Lazio & Sardinia

Girone H
teams from Campania, Apulia, Basilicata &Molise

Girone I
teams from Campania, Calabria, Basilicata, Sicily & Molise

Division winners
All teams promoted to 2009–10 Lega Pro Seconda Divisione

Scudetto Dilettanti

First round
division winners placed into 3 groups of 3
group winners and best second-placed team qualify for semi-finals

Group A

Group B

Group C

Semi-finals
First legs played June 6 & 7, 2009; return legs played June 13, 2009

Final
Played June 20, 2009 in Aprilia, Lazio

game suspended at the half with Pro Vasto leading 2-0 due to rioting by Siracusa fans
championship awarded to Pro Vasto with a 3-0 final score
Winners: Pro Vasto (F)

Tie-breakers

 before the promotion and relegation playoffs could begin, four tie-breakers needed to be played.

Girone B - 12th-13th place - played May 24, 2009

Casteggio Broni saved, Olginatese forced to play in relegation playoffs

Girone D - 16th-17th place - played May 24, 2009

Castellana to play in relegation playoffs, Comacchio Lidi directly relegated

Girone F - 5th-6th place - played May 24, 2009

only Campobasso qualified to play in promotional playoffs

Girone G - 12th-13th place - played May 24, 2009
 Morolo, Castelsardo & Lupa Frascati each finished with 40 points, tied for 12th position
 Head-to-head results: Morolo - 7 points, Castelsardo - 7, Lupa Frascati -3
 Lupa Frascati places 14th and forced to play in relegation playoffs, other two qualify for tie-breaker.

Morolo saved, Castelsardo forced to play in relegation playoffs

Promotion playoffs

Rules

 promotion playoffs involved a total of 36 teams; four from each of the nine Serie D divisions (teams placed from 2nd through to 5th with one exception)
 new for 2007-08, the Coppa Italia Serie D winner is directly admitted to the semi-final round. The 2008-09 cup winner was Sapri.
 since Sapri finished 3rd in division I, teams finishing 2nd, 4th, 5th & 6th were admitted to the playoffs in that division
 the first two rounds were one-legged matches played in the home field of the best-placed team.
 games ending in ties were extended to extra time.  New for the 2007-08 season, the higher classified team was declared the winner if the game was still tied after extra time.  Penalty kicks were not taken.
 Round one matched 2nd & 5th-placed teams, and 3rd & 4th-placed teams within each division, except for division I
 The two winners from each division played each other in the second round.
 The nine winners - one each from the nine Serie D divisions - were then split into three groups of three teams each.  Every team played two matches, one against each of the other two opponents within the group.  The three group winners qualified for the semifinal round, joining Sapri
 the semi-finals were two-legged matches, and the respective winners moved on to play in a one-legged final hosted in a neutral ground.
 the tournament results provided a list, starting with the winner, by which vacancies could be filled in Lega Pro Seconda Divisione

First round
Played on May 27, 2009; single-legged matches played at best placed club home field
2nd-placed team plays 5th-placed team, 3rd-placed team plays 4th placed team
games ending in a tie are extended to extra time, if still tied, the higher-classified team wins

Second round
Played on May 31, 2009; single-legged matches played at best placed club home field
games ending in a tie are extended to extra time, if still tied, the higher-classified team wins

Third round
group winners qualify for semi-finals

Group A

Group B

Group C

Semi-finals
First legs played June 17, 2009; return legs played June 21, 2009

Final
Played June 30, 2009 in Rieti, Lazio

Relegation playoffs
Played May 31 & June 7, 2009
in case of aggregate tie score, higher classified team wins
team highlighted in green saved, other is relegated to Eccellenza

Footnotes

Serie D seasons
5
Italy